East Technical High School or East Tech is a secondary school under the operation of the Cleveland Metropolitan School District in Cleveland, Ohio.

History
The school, when it opened on October 5, 1908, was the first public trade school in the city and reported to be only one of five in the United States. The first principal was James F. Barker (1906–1911) from Muskegon, Michigan.

In 1952, East Technical merged with Central High School. Central High was the first public high school in Cleveland and the first free secondary education institution west of the Allegheny Mountains paid for by taxpayers.

East Tech utilizes the small school system. Three small schools are located within East Tech: Ninth Grade Academy, Community Wrap Around, and Engineering Science & Technology

Athletics
The school was a sports powerhouse in the city, winning numerous titles in football, basketball and track and field. Some notable alumni include Olympic Games athletic stars such as Jesse Owens, Harrison Dillard and Dave Albritton. The original building stood for some 64 years until a new building was dedicated and moved into on October 11, 1972. The current structure now sits at the corner of E.55th and Quincy Ave on the east side of Cleveland. The original building has since been demolished.

Ohio High School Athletic Association State Championships

Track - 1920, 1921, 1932, 1933, 1936, 1939, 1940, 1941, 1942, 1943, 1944, 1947*, 1949*, 1952, 1955
Swimming - 1947, 1948
Basketball – 1958, 1959, 1972
Girls Basketball – 2002
 1947 and 1949 Track titles won by Central High School prior to consolidation with East Tech.

Notable alumni

Bob Brown, former NFL offensive tackle. Member of the College Football Hall of Fame and Pro Football Hall of Fame.
Charles F. Brush, engineer, inventor, electric pioneer and founder of a predecessor firm of General Electric (graduate of Central High).
Harrison Dillard (1923-2019), track and field athlete, Olympic gold medalist for the 100m dash
Benny Friedman (1905-1982), Hall of Fame NFL football quarterback
William Otto Frohring, biochemist, inventor, business executive. Co-inventor of SMA, the first commercial infant formula.
Larry Johnson, former MLB baseball player (Cleveland Indians, Montreal Expos, Chicago White Sox)
Markell Johnson, professional basketball player
Everett Lee, orchestra conductor (Norrköping Symphony Orchestra), violinist, first African-American to conduct a Broadway orchestra (On the Town), first African-American to conduct a grand opera (New York City Opera)
Toccara Montgomery, 2004 Olympian for Women's Wrestling
Jesse Owens, Track and field athlete, Olympic gold medalist for the 100m dash
John Favors: guru and governing body commissionerof the International Society for Krishna Consciousness.
Roger Peckinpaugh, former MLB baseball player (Cleveland Indians, New York Yankees, Washington Senators, Chicago White Sox) and manager (New York Yankees, Cleveland Indians)
Jack Trice (American football Player) The first African-American athlete at Iowa State College (now Iowa State University).
Barbara Turner, Women's basketball WNBA player, Seattle Storm, Botaş SK former Connecticut University player
Joe Vosmik, former MLB baseball player (Cleveland Indians, St. Louis Browns, Boston Red Sox, Brooklyn Dodgers, Washington Senators)
Harold Zisla (1925-2016), educator and abstract expressionist artist.

Notes and references

External links
District Website
The East Technical High School Alumni Association
East Technical High School June Bug - yearbooks available on Cleveland Public Library Digital Gallery, various years 1911 through 2005 
East Technical High School Scarab - weekly school newspaper available on Cleveland Public Library Digital Gallery, various years 1920s through 1950s

Education in Cleveland
High schools in Cuyahoga County, Ohio
Public high schools in Ohio
Cleveland Metropolitan School District
1908 establishments in Ohio
Educational institutions established in 1908